Club Deportivo INECEL was an Ecuadorian football club based in Manta. It was founded on June 15, 1962 by the employees of the Instituto Ecuatoriano de Electrificación (INECEL). It participated in the Serie A  for just one season in 1969. After of the relegation, the club disappeared in 1970.

Achievements

References

Defunct football clubs in Ecuador
Association football clubs established in 1962
Association football clubs disestablished in 1970
1962 establishments in Ecuador
1969 disestablishments in Ecuador